DXMG (88.7 FM), broadcasting as 88.7 Radyo BisDak, is a radio station owned by Ipil Broadcasting News Network, a media outlet run by former Mayor Francisco Pontanar, and operated by Times Broadcasting Network Corporation. The station's studio is located in Brgy. Poblacion, Ipil, Zamboanga Sibugay.

It was formerly a community radio station from its inception in the late 90s until 2016, when Bisdak Media Group took over the station's operations and became part of the Radyo BisDak network.

References

Radio stations established in 1995